Herbert Dean (born September 30, 1970) is an American professional mixed martial arts referee for the Ultimate Fighting Championship (UFC) and former fighter. UFC president Dana White, UFC color commentator Joe Rogan, articles covering MMA in ESPN.com, Fox Sports, Bleacher Report, SB Nation (mmamania.com), Fightland and other publications have called Dean the gold standard for referees in MMA.

UFC and notable matches 
At UFC 48, held on June 19, 2004, Dean refereed a bout between Tim Sylvia and Frank Mir for the vacant UFC Heavyweight Championship. At 0:50 (50 seconds) of round one, Dean called a stop to the fight when he saw Sylvia's right forearm break due to an armbar. Due to the close proximity of a UFC cameraman, in the video footage a shocked Dean can be heard shouting "Oh, shit!" when he saw the break, and he immediately moved in to stop the fight. This proved difficult, because Sylvia, who was still trying to defend the armbar, argued with him for several seconds, despite Dean's telling him "Stop, stop, stop! The fight is over!" Once freed from the armbar, Sylvia again began to argue with Dean, who continually told him, "It's fucking broken! Your arm is broken." Sylvia protested, claiming his arm was perfectly fine and even moving it around with no apparent problems. Dean, however, insisted that "I heard it snap. I saw it go." Ringside physician Dr. Margaret Goodman agreed with Dean's assessment, and the fight was not restarted. In the post-fight interview, Sylvia again denied that his arm was broken, however the slow-motion replay showed the break happening, and an X-ray that evening showed significant damage to Sylvia's arm, which required surgery and a long recovery. Sylvia later admitted that he knew his arm was broken and wanted to keep fighting in spite of that, but he thanked Dean for saving his career by ending the fight when he did.

At UFC 61, held on July 8, 2006, Dean served as referee of the highly anticipated rematch between Tito Ortiz and Ken Shamrock. At 1:18 into the first round, Dean stepped in and stopped the fight following several consecutive unanswered elbows to the head of Shamrock by Ortiz, giving the victory to Ortiz by TKO. Shamrock, visibly angered, immediately protested the decision. However, it was not overturned and Shamrock was subsequently ushered out of the Octagon. A rematch was held during Ortiz vs. Shamrock 3: The Final Chapter with Ortiz once again claiming victory in a very similar fashion to the second fight, although Shamrock did not question this decision.

At UFC 70, held on April 21, 2007, Dean was the referee during the bout between Mirko Cro Cop and Gabriel Gonzaga. Late in the first round, Dean stood the fight up from the guard position, a measure typically used against inactivity. Some fight analysts claim that Gonzaga was in fact administering ground and pound and had just maneuvered his opponent against the cage for an additional advantage. Shortly after the stand up, Gonzaga knocked out Filipović with a kick to the head. Filipović collapsed awkwardly after receiving the blow, pinning his right foot, which was rotated 180 degrees backwards, underneath his body. Dean quickly freed the pinned foot which helped prevent serious injury. Filipović has stated since that the elbows on the ground confused and damaged him enough that he was disoriented after the stand up, contributing to the subsequent knockout.

UFC president Dana White stated after UFC 109 and UFC 160, that he thinks Dean "is one of the best referees in this business. Actually, I think he's the best" in reference to his stoppage in the fight between Mike Swick and Paulo Thiago. He added that after Dean's stoppage of the Mir vs. Sylvia fight he never questions Dean. "When Herb Dean does shit, I don't even question it anymore. I wait for the replay. This guy sees shit that I can't see sitting there watching the monitor." At UFC 169, Dean caused controversy over his stoppage of the main card fight Renan Barão vs. Urijah Faber for the UFC bantamweight title. UFC president Dana White criticized Dean saying, "He made a mistake."

At UFC Fight Night: Hunt vs. Oleinik, Dean was heavily criticized for a late stoppage during his refereeing of a fight between Khalid Murtazaliev and C. B. Dollaway. Many fans took to Twitter afterwards, with near universal criticism towards the stoppage, comparing it to a recent late stoppage by fellow referee Mario Yamasaki.

At UFC 235, Dean was criticized by UFC president Dana White after he awarded a win to Ben Askren via bulldog choke against Robbie Lawler.

At UFC on ESPN: Whittaker vs. Till, Dean received more criticism for his late stoppage of a fight between Francisco Trinaldo and Jai Herbert, and got into an altercation with UFC commentator and former fighter Dan Hardy over the stoppage.

Awards 
Dean has won Fighters Only Magazine's World MMA Awards Referee of the Year in 2010, 2011, 2012, 2013, 2014, 2018, 2019 (–July 2020) and (July 2020–) 2021. Dean, however, missed out on the award in 2015 to ”Big” John McCarthy for the first time since the category was introduced.

Mixed martial arts record 
Dean is 2–3 in professional MMA with one win coming via submission and the other via technical knockout.

|-
| Loss
| align=center| 2–3
| Dave Legeno
| TKO (eye injury)
| Cage Rage 22
| 
| align=center| 1
| align=center| 5:00
| London, England
|
|-
| Loss
| align=center| 2–2
| Jung Gyu Choi
| Submission (americana)
| Spirit MC 9
| 
| align=center| 2
| align=center| 3:51
| South Korea
|
|-
| Win
| align=center| 2–1
| Timothy Mendoza
| TKO (knee and punches)
| KOTC 39: Hitmaster
| 
| align=center| 2
| align=center| 3:31
| San Jacinto, California, United States
|
|-
| Loss
| align=center| 1–1
| Joe Riggs
| TKO (Submission to punches)
| Rage in the Cage 43: The Match
| 
| align=center| 1
| align=center| 0:52
| Arizona, United States
|
|-
| Win
| align=center| 1–0
| Randy Halmot
| Submission (front choke)
| Gladiator Challenge 6
| 
| align=center| 1
| align=center| 0:43
| Colusa, California, United States
|

See also 
 List of male mixed martial artists

References

External links 
 
 
 List of major promotion bouts officiated by Herb Dean on Tapology

Living people
1970 births
American male mixed martial artists
Mixed martial artists from California
African-American mixed martial artists
Mixed martial arts referees
People from Pasadena, California
Sportspeople from Southern California
21st-century African-American sportspeople
20th-century African-American sportspeople